Divči is a small settlement northeast of Komen in the Littoral region of Slovenia.

References

External links

Divči on Geopedia

Populated places in the Municipality of Komen